Lemna aequinoctialis, the lesser duckweed, is a tiny, floating aquatic plant found in quiet waters in tropical and subtropical regions. Fronds are generally 3-nerved, green, up to 6 mm long. Flowers are 1-ovulate, the small utricular scale open on one side. Seeds have 8–26 ribs.

References

External links
Lemna aequinoctialis in Flora of North America
 

Lemnoideae
Freshwater plants
Flora of North America